Miguel Ángel Villar Pinto (A Coruña, 29 December 1977) is a Spanish writer, author of fairy tales, children's books, and novels.

Biography 
Villar Pinto participated in several archaeological excavations in (Huesca), (Basque Country) and (Galicia), in addition to archival works while he was studying history. In 2005 he published his first book.

Bibliography

Novels 
 La sangre de Dios. Septem Ediciones, 2005. .
 Balarian. Castellar de la Frontera: Castellarte, 2006. .
 El camino del guerrero. Málaga: Corona Borealis, 2006. .

Fairy tales 
 Leyendas de Arabia. Málaga: Corona Borealis, 2006. .
Abdellah y el genio de la botella
El más digno sucesor
El mensaje de las olas
El sello de Menandro
Ériador
La cueva en el desierto
La muerte de los dioses
La última batalla
 Los bosques perdidos. Edimáter: 2007. .
Búho Grande
Dindán
Elisa y los animales del bosque
El pequeño Tinsú
El problema de Gengar
El rey leñador
Iberto y la mala suerte
La estatua y su pedestal
La pregunta del emperador
La princesa infeliz
Tonelcillo
 El bazar de los sueños. Edimáter: 2009. .
Broan y Turin
El bazar de los sueños
El bosque de los ciervos blancos
El carpintero sin suerte
El cofre de los náufragos
El estanque mágico de Verdesmeralda
El viaje de Breogán
El vuelo de los cisnes
La biblioteca de Alejandría
La deuda del marajá
La maldición de la sirena de oro
Las estrellas capturadas

Children's books 
 Narsú y el collar mágico. Edimáter, 2008. .
 Las preguntas de Nair. Edimáter, 2009. .
 Este circo es un desastre. Edimáter, 2010. .
 La maldición del castillo desencantado. Edimáter, 2011. .

References

External links 
 Miguel Angel Villar Pinto: Official site
 Miguel Angel Villar Pinto: Official blog
Localia TV Interview (2008): World Book Day Children's and Young People (Spanish)
Localia TV Interview (2008): El camino del guerrero (Spanish)
Localia TV Interview (2007): El camino del guerrero and Leyendas de Arabia (Spanish)

1977 births
Living people
Spanish male writers
Writers from Galicia (Spain)
Spanish children's writers